Henry Knox "Heinie" Elder (August 23, 1890 – November 13, 1958) was a Major League Baseball pitcher. Heinie Elder was born in Seattle, Washington, and died in Long Beach, California.

Playing career
After attending the University of Minnesota, and playing baseball for the "Golden Gophers" in his 1911 freshman season, Heinie Elder played one game in the major leagues, at age 22, as a left-handed relief pitcher for the Detroit Tigers on July 7, 1913. He pitched 3-1/3 innings and gave up 4 hits, 5 bases on balls, and 3 earned runs for a single-game and career earned run average of 8.10.

Military service in two World Wars
Heinie Elder is one of the few major league players to have served in both World War I and World War II. He was a lieutenant colonel in the U.S. Army. He died in 1958 at age 68 in Long Beach, California. He was buried at the Los Angeles National Cemetery on Sepluveda Boulevard, north of Wilshire Boulevard, in Los Angeles, California.

Major league "Heinies"
"Heinie" was a popular nickname for German baseball players in the early part of the 20th century, particularly those whose first name was Henry, as Heinie was a familiar form of the German equivalent Heinrich. Elder was one of 22 major league Heinies in the first half of the century. Others include: Heinie Beckendorf 1909–1910; Heinie Berger 1907–1910; Heinie Groh 1912–1927; Heinie Heitmuller 1909–1910; Heinie Heltzel 1943–1944; Heinie Jantzen 1912-1912; Heinie Kappel 1887–1889;  Heinie Manush 1923-1939 - the only Hall of Fame "Heinie"; Heinie Meine 1922–1934, also known as "The Count Of Luxemburg"; Heinie Mueller 1920–1935; Heinie Mueller 1938–1941;  Heinie Odom 1925-1925; Heinie Peitz 1892–1913; Heinie Reitz 1893–1899; Heinie Sand 1923–1928; Heinie Scheer 1922–1923; Heinie Schuble 1927–1936; Heinie Smith 1897–1903; Heinie Stafford 1916-1916; Heinie Wagner 1902–1918; and Heinie Zimmerman 1907-1919 - implicated in the Chicago "Black Sox" scandal. After the end of World War II, no further major league player has gone by the nickname "Heinie."

Notes

External links

Baseball Almanac

1890 births
1958 deaths
Major League Baseball pitchers
Detroit Tigers players
Baseball players from Washington (state)
Minnesota Golden Gophers baseball players
United States Army officers
United States Army personnel of World War I
United States Army personnel of World War II